Howson is a surname. Notable people with the surname include:

 Howson family, show business dynasty
 Albert Howson (1881–1960), American actor
 Charles Howson (1896–1976), English footballer 
 Colin Howson (1945–2020), British philosopher
 Emma Howson (1844–1928), Australian opera singer and actress
 Frank Howson (born 1952), Australian film director and producer 
 George Howson (1860–1919), English educationalist
 George Arthur Howson (1886–1936), British Army officer 
 Helena Kaut-Howson, British theatre and opera director
 Herb Howson (1872–1948), Australian rules footballer
 James Howson (1856–1934), English churchman
 Joan Howson (1885–1964), British stained glass artist
 John Howson (c.1557–1632), English bishop
 John Howson (priest) (1816–1885), English divine 
 John-Michael Howson (born 1936), Australian writer
 Jonny Howson (born 1988), English footballer 
 Peter Howson (born 1958), Scottish painter
 Peter Howson (politician) (1919–2009), Australian politician
 Richard Howson (born 1968), British businessman
 Richie Howson (born 1965), English darts player
 Scott Howson (born 1960), Canadian ice hockey player
 Sean Howson (born 1981), Montserratian footballer
 Spencer Howson (born 1972), Australian radio presenter
 Susan Howson (mathematician) (born 1973), British mathematician
 Susan Howson (economist) (born 1945), Canadian economist
 William Howson (disambiguation), various people
 William R. Howson (1883–1952), Canadian politician and judge
 William Howson (footballer) (born 1892), English (soccer) footballer

See also
 Howison